Open Banking Nigeria is an open banking initiative created as non-partisan and non-financial API standards for Nigerian financial services.

Objectives 
The objectives of Open Banking Nigeria are:
Analyze the need of the industry for common API standards among banks and other financial institutions.
Develop the common API standards.
Provide a sandbox and other testing tools for certification.
Promote adoption of open banking standards with stakeholders across Nigeria.
Enable further innovation in the financial services industry.

History 
On 1 June 2017, a group of bankers and fintech experts in Nigeria got together for the Open Banking Nigeria initiative to drive the adoption of common API standards for the country. This is in response to the growing interest in open banking in other financial jurisdictions worldwide. For example, the European Union the European Parliament adopted a revised Payment Services Directive, known as (PSD2) for the SEPA region. The United Kingdom also has the Open Banking project driven by the Competition and Markets Authority.

See also 
 Open banking
 Account aggregation
 PSD2

References

External links
Open Banking Nigeria Project
Open Bank Project
Directory of Open Banking Sites

2017 establishments in Nigeria
Banking technology
Banking in Nigeria